Fisk is an English surname. Notable people with the surname include:

Carlton Fisk (born 1947), American baseball player
Charles Brenton Fisk (1925–1983), American organ builder
C. B. Fisk, Inc., the company he founded
Eliot Fisk (born 1954), American classical guitarist
Eric Fisk (born 1931), English cricketer and Royal Air Force officer
Erma Johnson Fisk (1905–1990), American nature writer and ornithologist
Ernest Fisk (1886–1965), English Australian radio pioneer, entrepreneur, and businessman
Fidelia Fisk (sometimes spelled Fiske; 1816–1864), American Congregationalist missionary
Greenleaf Fisk (known as the "Father of Brownwood, Texas"; 1807–1888), American pioneer and politician
Greg Fisk (1945–2015), American politician and fisheries consultant; mayor of Juneau, Alaska
Jack Fisk (born 1946), American film production designer and director
James Fisk (financier) (known as "Diamond Jim"; 1834–1872), American stockbroker and railroad executive
Jason Fisk (born 1972), American football player
Jonathan Fisk (1778–1832), American lawyer and politician; US House Representative for New York
Katherine Tanner Fisk (1860s–1926), American contralto singer and actor
Martin Fisk (born 1946), British actor
Molly Fisk (born 1955), American poet and radio commentator
Nicholas Fisk (pseudonym of David Higginbottom; 1923–2016), British science fiction author
Pauline Fisk (1948–2015), British children's author
Pliny Fisk (1792–1825), American Congregationalist missionary
Pliny Fisk III (born 1944), American architect
Robert Fisk (1946–2020), British journalist and author
Sari Fisk (born 1971), Finnish Olympic bronze medalist in women's ice hockey
Schuyler Fisk (born 1982), American actress and singer
Steve Fisk (born ?), audio engineer, record producer, and musician
Wilbur Fisk, (1792–1839), American Methodist minister, educator, and theologian
Herbert Fisk Johnson III (known as "Fisk" Johnson; born 1958), American business executive

Fictional characters:
Richard Fisk, anti-hero from the Marvel Universe
Vanessa Fisk, non-villainous wife of Wilson "Kingpin" Fisk
Wilson Fisk (known as "Kingpin"), supervillain from the Marvel Universe; husband of Vanessa Fisk

English-language surnames
 Germanic-language surnames